Gilbert Lukalia is a Kenyan actor and film director.

Career
Lukalia grew up in a military family and began his early career as a stage actor at the Kenya National Theatre. He has also worked in multiple different positions in the film industry: as an assistant director and producer He is currently working at the Nairobi based Dream House Productions, which produces theatre plays, music events, TV-series and films both for Tv and big screen

He has acted and directed award-winning feature films and TV series in Kenya including Mission to Rescue, Shattered, Pray and Prey, Lost in Africa and the First Grader.

Mission to Rescue was in 2021 selected as Kenya's submission at the 94th Academy Awards in the Best International Feature Film category.

He has also directed some international films such as The Marshal of Finland. The film's world premiere was at The Helsinki International Love & Anarchy Film Festival on 28 September 2012.

He also directed Strength of A Woman in 2014 where it received nominations at the 2014 Kalasha Awards and won five awards. It won awards for Best Feature Film, Best Director, Best Actress, Best Lighting and Best Original Score. It had stars renowned Kenyan actors with Rose K. Njoroge taking the lead role and Laura Leila Wingate, Ashford Kirimi, Sandra Dhacha taking up supporting roles which they expertly and vividly depict.

References

Kenyan male film actors
Kenyan film directors
Year of birth missing (living people)
Living people